The 1984 Minnesota Twins season was a season in American baseball. The team finished with a record of 81–81, tied for second in the American League West, and three games behind the division winner Kansas City Royals.  Their 81–81 record was an 11-game improvement from 1983, and a 21-game improvement from their 102-loss season of 1982 (the third-worst record in franchise history).

1,598,692 fans attended Twins games, a Twins attendance record, but still the fifth-lowest total in the American League. Towards the end of the season, Calvin Griffith sold the club to local investor Carl Pohlad.

Offseason
 October 1983: Jeff Little was released by the Twins.
 December 7, 1983: Gary Ward and Sam Sorce (minors) were traded by the Twins to the Texas Rangers for John Butcher and Mike Smithson.
 January 17, 1984: Mark Grace was drafted by the Twins in the 15th round of the 1984 Major League Baseball draft, but did not sign.

Regular season
 May 4 - Oakland's Dave Kingman popped up in the fourth inning.  The ball found a drainage hole in the Metrodome's roof and never returned to the playing surface.  Kingman was awarded a ground-rule double.  In the ninth, he hit another ball out—but this one was just into the seats.
 May 8 – Kirby Puckett got four hits in his major league debut, at Anaheim Stadium.
 June 29 – Andre David made his major league debut and started in right field for the Twins.  In his first at bat in the second inning, he homered off Detroit Tigers pitcher Jack Morris to become the fourth Twin to homer in his first-ever at bat.  David joined Rick Renick (1968), Dave McKay (1975) and Gary Gaetti (1981); three of the four were against Detroit pitching.  In 2015, Eddie Rosario joins the list when he homers on the very first pitch he sees in the majors.
 Only one Twins player made the All-Star Game, catcher Dave Engle.
 September 28 – The Twins suffered their biggest blown lead for a loss in team history.  Leading Cleveland 10-0 in the third inning, and 10-2 in the sixth, they lost the 9-inning game 11-10.  In the ninth, relievers Ron Davis and Ed Hodge loaded the bases.  Hodge allowed a walk-off single.

Offense

Kent Hrbek hit .311 with 27 HR and 107 RBI.
Tom Brunansky hit 32 HR and 85 RBI.
Leadoff batter Kirby Puckett hit .296 and scored 63 runs.
Gary Gaetti hit 5 HR and 65 RBI.

Pitching

Starter Frank Viola was 18-12.
Reliever Ron Davis had 29 saves.  He also blew 14 saves, to tie a major league record set in 1976 and tied two other times.
Mike Smithson allowed 35 homers, the most in the majors.

Defense

Gary Gaetti led the major leagues playing in 162 games.  His 334 assists led all of baseball this season.  Outfield teammates Kirby Puckett (center) and Tom Brunansky (right) also led the major leagues in assists.

Season standings

Record vs. opponents

Notable transactions
 June 4, 1984: Jay Bell was drafted by the Twins in the 1st round (8th pick) of the 1984 Major League Baseball draft. Jay Bell signed on June 11, 1984.

Roster

Game log

Regular season

|-style=background:#fbb
| 1 || April 3 || 7:35p.m. CST || Tigers || 1–8 || Morris (1–0) || Williams (0–1) || – || 2:10 || 34,381 || 0–1 || L1
|-style=background:#fbb
| 2 || April 5 || 12:15p.m. CST || Tigers || 3–7 || Petry (1–0) || Viola (0–1) || – || 2:33 || 8,373 || 0–2 || L2
|-style=background:#bbb
| — || April 23 || || @ Tigers || colspan=8 | Postponed (Rain) (Makeup date: April 24)
|-style=background:#fbb
| 17 || April 24 || 4:30p.m. CST || @ Tigers || 5–6 || Morris (4–0) || Davis (2–2) || – || 2:16 || N/A || 8–9 || L1
|-style=background:#fbb
| 18 || April 24 || 7:21p.m. CST || @ Tigers || 3–4 || Abbott (1–0) || Viola (0–3) || López (1) || 2:29 || 20,315 || 8–10 || L2
|-

|-

|-style=background:#cfc
| 74 || June 29 || 4:35p.m. CST || @ Tigers || 5–3 || Williams (3–3) || Morris (12–4) || Davis (15) || 2:50 || N/A || 37–37 || W1
|-style=background:#fbb
| 75 || June 29 || 8:00p.m. CDT || @ Tigers || 5–7 || Hernández (4–0) || Filson (4–2) || – || 3:00 || 44,619 || 37–38 || L1
|-style=background:#fbb
| 76 || June 30 || 6:35p.m. CDT || @ Tigers || 3–4 || Petry (11–3) || Schrom (1–3) || Hernández (14) || 2:43 || 48,095 || 37–39 || L2
|-

|-style=background:#cfc
| 77 || July 1 || 12:30p.m. CDT || @ Tigers || 9–0 || Viola (8–7) || Berenguer (4–6) || – || 2:21 || 43,484 || 38–39 || L1
|-style=background:#bbbfff
|colspan="12"|55th All-Star Game in San Francisco, CA
|-style=background:#cfc
| 85 || July 12 || 7:35p.m. CDT || Tigers || 4–2 || Viola (10–7) || Petry (11–4) || Davis (17) || 2:18 || 29,729 || 44–41 || W2
|-style=background:#fbb
| 86 || July 13 || 7:35p.m. CDT || Tigers || 3–5  || Hernández (5–0) || Lysander (0–1) || López (10) || 3:11 || 30,050 || 44–42 || L1
|-style=background:#fbb
| 87 || July 14 || 7:35p.m. CDT || Tigers || 5–6  || Hernández (6–0) || Walters (0–3) || – || 3:40 || 46,017 || 44–43 || L2
|-style=background:#fbb
| 88 || July 15 || 1:15p.m. CDT || Tigers || 2–6 || Rozema (6–1) || Schrom (2–4) || López (11) || 3:00 || 27,965 || 44–44 || L3
|-

|-

|-

|- style="text-align:center;"
| Legend:       = Win       = Loss       = PostponementBold = Twins team member

Player stats

Batting

Starters by position
Note: Pos = Position; G = Games played; AB = At bats; H = Hits; Avg. = Batting average; HR = Home runs; RBI = Runs batted in

Other batters
Note: G = Games played; AB = At bats; H = Hits; Avg. = Batting average; HR = Home runs; RBI = Runs batted in

Pitching

Starting pitchers
Note: G = Games pitched; IP = Innings pitched; W = Wins; L = Losses; ERA = Earned run average; SO = Strikeouts

Other pitchers
Note: G = Games pitched; IP = Innings pitched; W = Wins; L = Losses; ERA = Earned run average; SO = Strikeouts

Relief pitchers
Note: G = Games pitched; W = Wins; L = Losses; SV = Saves; ERA = Earned run average; SO = Strikeouts

Awards and honors

All-Star Game
 Dave Engle, reserve

Farm system

LEAGUE CHAMPIONS: Elizabethton

Notes

References

External links
Player stats from www.baseball-reference.com
Team info from www.baseball-almanac.com

Minnesota Twins seasons
Minnesota Twins season
Minnesota Twins